Vladimir Ilić (born 24 February 1999) is a Serbian football defender who plays for Radnički Sremska Mitrovica in Serbian First League.

Club career
After he spent his youth career with Intenacional Beograd, in summer 2018 he signed with Dinamo Vranje. Ilić made his official debut for Dinamo Vranje in 1 fixture match of the 2018–19 Serbian SuperLiga season against Red Star.

References

External links
 
 
 Profileat srbijafudbal.com  

Sportspeople from Sremska Mitrovica
1999 births
Living people
Association football defenders
Serbian footballers
FK Dinamo Vranje players
FK Sinđelić Beograd players
Serbian SuperLiga players
Serbian First League players